Van de Leur or Vandeleur is a surname. Notable people with the surname include:

 Crofton Vandeleur (1735–1794), Irish politician, MP for Ennis 1768–1776
 Crofton Moore Vandeleur (1809–1881), Irish landowner and politician, MP for Clare 1859–1874
 Giles Vandeleur (1911–1978), British Army officer during the Second World War
 Sir John Ormsby Vandeleur (British Army officer) (1763–1849), British Army General who fought in the French Revolutionary and Napoleonic wars
 John Ormsby Vandeleur (Ennis MP) (1765–1828), Irish landowner and politician, MP for Ennis and Carlow
 John Ormsby Vandeleur (MP for Granard) (1767–1822), Irish politician, MP for Granard 1790–1798
 Joe Vandeleur (1903–1988), British Army officer who served in the Second World War
 Thomas Burton Vandeleur (c.1767-1835), judge of the Court of King's Bench (Ireland).
 Verona van de Leur (born 1985), Dutch gymnast

See also
 Vandeleur, Ontario